Alan Mobberley is a British car designer. He is former Head of Design at Land Rover; a position he held for 19 years. The last project he worked on was the Land Rover Discovery 4.

His current role is Head of Design at David Brown Automotive, for which he designed their first model, Speedback GT.

References

British automobile designers
1948 births
Living people
People from Coventry